MeBeam was a video chat website, that allowed any user to create videoconference rooms for up to 16 people. MeBeam did not require registration, login or downloading of software.

Overview 

The site was launched by Ashod Apakian in November 2007 as a web-based demo of a research application he was working on.  The goal was to create the world's fastest videotelephony site.  It gained popularity after a plugin was developed to provide multi-party videoconferencing for Adium in August 2008, after being featured on Digg.

The site was also featured on Chris Pirillo, at which point it gained widespread usage.

The website used Adobe Systems Flash Player to display video and access the user's webcam. It works across, Windows, Linux and Macintosh, along with any web browser that supported Flash 8.

See also 
 Online chat
 Web chat

References

External links 
 MeBeam.com (official website)

Online chat
Internet properties established in 2007
Videotelephony